Carlos Hilado Memorial State University (CHMSU, pronounced), also colloquially called by its former acronym CHMSC (pronounced ), is a public, state-owned university, the main campus of which is in Talisay, Negros Occidental, Philippines. It provides preschool, elementary, secondary, higher technological, professional and vocational instruction and training in science, agriculture and industrial fields, as well as short-term or vocational courses.

History

In 1954, the Representative of the Second District of Negros Occidental, Carlos A. Hilado authored  a bill creating the first trade-technical school in the province, the Negros Occidental School of Arts and Trades in the then town of Talisay.

In 1984, Paglaum State College was established by virtue of Batas Pambansa No. 477, which caused the merger of three educational institutions in the province of Negros Occidental: Negros Occidental School of Arts and Trades in Talisay, Provincial Community College in Fortune Towne, Bacolod City, and the Bacolod City National Trade School in Alijis, Bacolod City. Paglaum is a Hiligaynon word which means "hope".

In 1994, by virtue of Republic Act (RA) no. 7707 authored by Representative Jose Carlos V. Lacson, Paglaum State College was renamed Carlos Hilado Memorial State College in honor of Congressman Carlos A. Hilado.

On November 24, 2000, Carlos Hilado Memorial State College acquired another satellite campus with the integration of the Negros Occidental School of Fisheries in Binalbagan, Negros Occidental into the state college.

In 2018, the family of then E.B. Magalona vice mayor Robert F. Acaling donated a 3-hectare lot in Barangay Alicante, EB Magalona, to serve as a Research and Extension Center of the university and named it the Jesús Fermin Research and Extension Center. In the same year, Carmen Agricultural Development Inc. also donated a 3-hectare lot in Barangay San Jose, Binalbagan.

On April 26, 2019, Carlos Hilado Memorial State College was converted into a state university as per law filed by Representatives Greg Gasataya of Bacolod, Albee Benitez of the First District of Negros Occidental, and Bebot Mirasol of the Fifth District of Negros Occidental, by virtue of Republic Act (RA) no. 11336, which was sponsored by Senator Bam Aquino.

On April 19, 2022, the school officially changed its name to Carlos Hilado State University after the Commission on Higher Education en banc approved the conversion of the school and all its satellite campuses in Bacolod City and Municipality of Binalbagan through Resolution 209-2022 after having been found compliant with the requirements for conversion as stipulated in Section 21 of RA 11336.

Campuses
Carlos Hilado Memorial State University, Talisay – administrative seat in Talisay, Negros Occidental
Carlos Hilado Memorial State University, Alijis – satellite campus in Bacolod, Negros Occidental
Carlos Hilado Memorial State University, Fortune Towne – satellite campus in Bacolod, Negros Occidental
Carlos Hilado Memorial State University, Binalbagan – satellite campus in the town of Binalbagan, Negros Occidental

See also
List of tertiary schools in Bacolod
Technological University of the Philippines Visayas

External links
Official website
Accrediting Agency of Chartered Colleges and Universities in the Philippines: Accredited programs of Carlos Hilado Memorial State University

References

Universities and colleges in Bacolod
Educational institutions established in 1954
1954 establishments in the Philippines